The Original Taco House was a chain of Mexican restaurants based in Portland, Oregon. Established by the Waddle family in 1960, the business peaked at five locations. The last remaining two locations closed on December 31, 2017.

See also

 Hispanics and Latinos in Portland, Oregon
 List of defunct restaurants of the United States
 List of Mexican restaurants

References

1960 establishments in Oregon
2017 disestablishments in Oregon
Defunct restaurants in Portland, Oregon
Mexican restaurants in Portland, Oregon
Restaurants disestablished in 2017
Restaurants established in 1960
Defunct Mexican restaurants in the United States